Olivia Alexandra Isip McDaniel (born October 14, 1997), known as Olivia Davies-McDaniel, is an American-born Filipino footballer who plays as a goalkeeper for the Philippines women's national team.

Early life
Davies-McDaniel was born in Laguna Beach, California and raised in Corona, California. She has attended the Norco High School. Her mother Lindy is a Filipino who has roots in Pampanga and Davao City, while her father Clint is a football (soccer) coach. She started playing football when she was seven years old.

College career
Davies-McDaniel has attended the California State University, Fullerton and the University of Wisconsin–Milwaukee.

International career
Davies-McDaniel has represented the Philippines at the 2022 AFC Women's Asian Cup qualifiers. She was part of the team which played in the historic quarterfinals match against Chinese Taipei which went on to a penalty shootout after a 1–1 draw. She prevented two out of three penalties by Chinese Taipei and successfully made a penalty kick herself. As a result, the Philippines qualified for the 2023 FIFA Women's World Cup, the country's first ever world cup.

Personal life
Davies-McDaniel's sister, Chandler, is also a Philippines women's international footballer while her brother Griffin has been a part of Philippine club Stallion Laguna since 2020.

Honours

International

Philippines
Southeast Asian Games third place: 2021
AFF Women's Championship: 2022

References

External links

1997 births
Living people
Citizens of the Philippines through descent
Filipino women's footballers
Women's association football goalkeepers
Philippines women's international footballers
People from Laguna Beach, California
Sportspeople from Orange County, California
Soccer players from California
Sportspeople from Corona, California
American women's soccer players
Cal State Fullerton Titans women's soccer players
Milwaukee Panthers women's soccer players
American sportspeople of Filipino descent
Southeast Asian Games bronze medalists for the Philippines
Southeast Asian Games medalists in football
Competitors at the 2021 Southeast Asian Games